The women's C-1 1000 metres competition at the 2022 ICF Canoe Sprint World Championships in Dartmouth took place on Lake Banook.

Schedule
The schedule is as follows:

Results
With fewer than ten competitors entered, this event was held as a direct final.

References

ICF